Blair Robert Hopping (born 12 August 1980 in Pukekohe) is a field hockey player from New Zealand, who earned his first cap for the national team, nicknamed The Black Sticks, in 2000 against Pakistan.  He competed for New Zealand at the 2004 Summer Olympics in Athens, the 2008 Summer Olympics in Beijing and the 2012 Summer Olympics in London and at the 2002 Commonwealth Games in Manchester and the 2006 Commonwealth Games in Melbourne.

Hopping taught Physical Education at Rangitoto College on Auckland's North Shore and coaches the school's 1st XI.  He left that to join TigerTurf, New Zealand's only Synthetic Sports Surface manufacturer, on a part-time basis in 2006 and full-time since 2011. After retiring from Hockey, Blair now helps to upgrade and build new Hockey surfaces in New Zealand.

International Senior Tournaments
 2001 – World Cup Qualifier
 2002 – World Cup
 2002 – Commonwealth Games
 2003 – Sultan Azlan Shah Cup
 2003 – Champions Challenge
 2004 – Olympic Qualifying Tournament
 2004 – Olympic Games
 2004 – Champions Trophy
 2005 – Sultan Azlan Shah Cup
 2006 – Commonwealth Games
 2006 – Hockey World Cup
 2007 – Champions Challenge
 2008 – Olympic Games
 2012 – Olympic Games

References

External links
 

New Zealand male field hockey players
Olympic field hockey players of New Zealand
Field hockey players at the 2002 Commonwealth Games
2002 Men's Hockey World Cup players
Field hockey players at the 2004 Summer Olympics
Field hockey players at the 2006 Commonwealth Games
2006 Men's Hockey World Cup players
Field hockey players at the 2008 Summer Olympics
2010 Men's Hockey World Cup players
1980 births
Living people
Commonwealth Games silver medallists for New Zealand
Field hockey players at the 2012 Summer Olympics
Commonwealth Games medallists in field hockey
Medallists at the 2002 Commonwealth Games